The Comamonadaceae are a family of the Betaproteobacteria. Like all Pseudomonadota, they are Gram-negative. They are aerobic and most of the species are motile via flagella. The cells are curved rod-shaped.

References

External links

 Comamonadaceae J.P. Euzéby: List of Prokaryotic names with Standing in Nomenclature

 
Burkholderiales